The Sanjak of Prizren or Priştine (/ Prizrenski sandžak) was one of the sanjaks in the Ottoman Empire with Prizren as its administrative centre. It was founded immediately after Ottoman Empire captured Prizren from Serbian Despotate in 1455. The rest of the territory of Serbian Despotate was conquered after the fall of Smederevo in 1459, and divided into following sanjaks: Sanjak of Vučitrn, Sanjak of Kruševac and Sanjak of Smederevo. At the beginning of the First Balkan War in 1912, the territory of Sanjak of Prizren was occupied by the army of the Kingdom of Serbia. Based on Treaty of London signed on 30 May 1913, the territory of Sanjak of Prizren became part of Serbia.

Administrative divisions 
According to the 1571 Ottoman register, the Sanjak of Prizren consisted of five nahiyahs: Prizren, Hoča, Žežna, Trgovište and Bihor.

In its final borders (between  1889 and 1913), the Sanjak of Prizren consisted of the kaza (districts) of Prizren, Tetovo and Gostivar.

The territory that once belonged to the Sanjak of Prizren now belongs to Kosovo (Prizren region) and North Macedonia (Tetovo and Gostivar regions).

Skopje, Prizren and Kosovo vilayets 

In 1867, the Sanjak of Prizren merged with the Sanjak of Dibra and Sanjak of Skopje and became the Prizren Vilayet. In 1871 the Sanjak of Prizren became part of the newly established Prizren Vilayet. The Prizren Vilayet and its sanjaks, together with the Sanjak of Prizren, became part of the Kosovo Vilayet, which was established in 1877. Prizren was decided to be the seat of Kosovo vilayet.

The Sanjak of Niš and Sanjak of Pirot together with Vranje (which was kaza of the Sanjak of Priština) were separated from Kosovo vilayet and joined to the Principality of Serbia after Berlin Congress in 1878. The Sanjak of Dibra was attached to the Monastir Vilayet. After those changes Kosovo Vilayet consisted of three sanjaks: the Sanjak of Prizren, Sanjak of Skopje and Sanjak of Novi Pazar. Despite the decisions of Berlin Congress to award control over the Sanjak of Novi Pazar to Austria-Hungary, it remained under de facto administration of the Ottoman Empire.

Young Turk Revolution 
After the Young Turk Revolution, occurred in 1908, the Ottoman Empire organized the first parliamentary elections in the Sanjak of Prizren.

Disestablishment 

Until the end of October 1912, during the First Balkan War, the Sanjak of Prizren was occupied by the Kingdom of Serbia. On the basis of the Treaty of London signed during the London Conference in 1913, its territory became part of Serbia.

Notes and references
Notes:

References:

Literature 
 
 
 

1455 establishments in the Ottoman Empire
1913 disestablishments in the Ottoman Empire
Sanjaks of the Ottoman Empire in Europe
Ottoman period in the history of Kosovo
Sanjak
Ottoman Albania
Kosovo vilayet